Welleritidae is one of five families of the Schistoceratoidea superfamily. They are an extinct group of ammonoids, which are shelled cephalopods related to squids, belemnites, octopuses, and cuttlefish, and more distantly to the nautiloids.

Subfamilies
Axinolobinae
Axinolobus
Paraphaneroceras
Welleritinae
Aqishanoceras
Eowellerites
Faqingoceras
Wellerites
Winslowoceras

References
 The Paleobiology Database accessed on 10/01/07

Schistocerataceae
Goniatitida families